is a Japanese professional footballer who currently plays for Hong Kong Third Division club Kowloon Cricket Club.

Playing career

Dreams FC
Only making 2 appearances in his debut season, Kitamura decided to move to Dreams FC to increase his playing time and opportunities, joining his former coach from his time at Kitchee, Leung Chi Wing. He left the club a year later.

Rangers
On 10 January 2020, Kitamura joined another HKPL club Rangers.

Career statistics

Club

Notes

References

External links
 
 
 Profile at Knox College
 Profile at the University of Massachusetts Lowell

1996 births
Living people
Japanese footballers
Japanese expatriate footballers
Association football midfielders
Mogi Mirim Esporte Clube players
Eastern Sports Club footballers
Dreams Sports Club players
Hong Kong Rangers FC players
Hong Kong Premier League players
Japanese expatriate sportspeople in the United States
Expatriate soccer players in the United States
Japanese expatriate sportspeople in Brazil
Expatriate footballers in Brazil
Knox College (Illinois) alumni
UMass Lowell River Hawks men's soccer players